Rumo may refer to:

People
 Rumo von Ramstein (died ca. 1300), German abbot

Places
 , town in Sumaila
 Rumo, Trentino, Italy
 RUMO Plant, Nizhny Novgorod, Russia

Other
 Rumo, title character of Rumo and His Miraculous Adventures
 Rumo S.A., Brazilian logistics company